Charles W. Bowman (born June 2, 1937) is an American actor, director, producer and writer of film and television.

Career
Bowman's career has spanned over forty years working in television directing episodes of The Incredible Hulk, The Greatest American Hero, The A-Team, T. J. Hooker, MacGyver, In the Heat of the Night, They Came from Outer Space, Murder, She Wrote, Swamp Thing: The Series, Touched by an Angel, Dr. Quinn, Medicine Woman, The Pretender, Walker Texas Ranger and Castle as well as number of television and theatrical feature films, including the Stephen J. Cannell production of The Tooth Fairy.

As an actor, he appeared numerous times on Dragnet and Adam-12, playing a different character in each episode as well as appearing in episodes of The Rockford Files, Hardcastle and McCormick and most recently Day Break.

Personal life
He is the father of film and television director Rob Bowman. He now lives in Los Angeles with his wife Lisa.

He is an alum of Los Angeles City College.

Filmography
 1970  Dragnet Newspaper reporter. S. P. M.

References

External links

Male actors from Kansas
American male television actors
American television directors
American television producers
American television writers
American male television writers
Living people
People from Coffeyville, Kansas
1937 births
Film directors from Kansas
Screenwriters from Kansas